Once Upon a Time in Shanghai (Chinese: 惡戰) is a 2014 Hong Kong-Chinese martial arts film directed by Wong Ching-po and starring Sammo Hung, Philip Ng and Andy On with action choreography by Yuen Woo-ping and Yuen Cheung-yan. The film is a remake of the 1972 film Boxer from Shantung which starred Chen Kuan-tai, who also appears in a supporting role in this film.

Plot

Possessing unique super strength and martial arts skills since childhood, Ma Yongzhen (Philip Ng) travels from his hometown to Shanghai to seek a livelihood. There he meets a man from his hometown, Niu Sanguang, who asks the village leader, Master Tie, to feed and give housing to Ma, because he feels an obligation to take care of him. To celebrate his arrival, Niu brings Ma to the Peony night club, owned by a major gang leader and one of the four leaders of a faction called the Axe fraternity. There, he sees rising gang boss Long Qi (Andy On), whose ruthlessness and powerful martial arts skills have put the four gang leaders of Shanghai's reigning Axe fraternity on notice and pushed their territory from four even parts of Shanghai to just only half of it under the Axe fraternity and half under his own reign. Long Qi beats the rival gang leader to death, and sends another back with a message: that the club, now named Paradise Night Club, would mark the border of his and the Axe fraternity's territory, further reducing their land holdings.

Ma Yongzhen tries to find a job at the pier. He arm-wrestles everyone and wins easily, proving his extreme strength. Finally, a local gangster comes and challenges Ma to an arm-wrestle. He says that if Ma can last one minute against him, he would hire him; Ma gives a counter-offer of three minutes, but if he lasts, the gangster must hire two of his friends as well. The gangster agrees, and Ma wins, earning three people jobs for eighty cents a day.

Back at the village, Ma is pressured by an acquaintance to sell a package of opium, that he mistakenly brings home instead of a package of imported Japanese tea. He tells Ma that one small package of opium could sell six to seven hundred silver dollars, an enormous sum, but Ma is only interested in making honest money. Ma tells him to return the package, but he doesn't do so. That night, the gangster who hired Ma comes to the village to find the package of opium. He threatens to kill a young girl, and is about to cut her head off when Master Tie and Ma beat up the gangster and his men, keeping the village safe.

Later on, Ma takes the opium and returns it to the gangster, while questioning if that amount of opium was worth a person's life. The gangster replies by saying it was not just worth one - it was worth more than the whole village combined. Ma fights with him and his hooligans, and beats them all up. The police come and arrest the gangsters, and seize the opium. Inspector Wang of the police department tells the Japanese and the Axe federation that the opium cannot be returned to them, making their relationship on edge.

Both youths possess insanely good martial arts skills. Ma righteously challenges Long Qi over his criminal activities at the pier with a duration of a cigarette in which if Ma won, he could have the entire truckloads of Opium for himself. Ma won the fight but instead of taking it and selling it out, he burnt the Opium right in front of Long Qi and Long Qi is impressed by Ma's stalwart character and martial arts skills. Soon, Long Qi offers to be Ma's benefactor.

Ma doesn't wish to be a criminal, but uses his connection with Long Qi to snag honest jobs for himself and his friends. Eventually both youths become good friends, and bond. Long Qi persuades Ma to join him to fight against the Axe fraternity but is refused by Ma.

Meanwhile, the chairman of the Japanese chamber of commerce, Hashimoto Hiroichi, tries to gain Japanese influence in Shanghai. He first approaches Long Qi, and proposes to form an alliance, which he claims is for their mutual benefit in trade, but in actuality is a stepping stone for Japanese domination in Shanghai. Long Qi sees through his cover, however, and asks Hiroichi about his real intentions. He then laughs at Hiroichi's propositions and translates them as bribing him, who is in the way of Japanese control over Shanghai, so that he can betray his own country. Hiroichi asks why Long Qi stole his shipment of opium, at which he replies that it felt good and he wanted to do it for no reason - just like the massacre of the Northern Chinese provinces during the Japanese invasion of China. Hiroichi has no choice but to leave, after accomplishing nothing.

Angered by Long Qi's rejection, Hiroichi goes to see the leaders of the Axe fraternity, to whom he also proposes an alliance, this time, to kill Long Qi. Holding a grudge against him for botching the Axe fraternity's drug trade and claiming their territory, the Axe leaders start planning his assassination.

Ma, helplessly watches as Long Qi dies, and Master Tie is brutally murdered which eventually leads him to embark on a path of vengeance. He kills the leaders of the Axe fraternity, and defeats several samurai, as well as the man who killed Master Tie. Finally, urged by his fiancée, he fights the Japanese gang leader. During the fight, they seem evenly matched, but soon, enraged by the murders of almost everyone he has built a relationship with, Ma Yongzhen charges towards the Japanese man. His fist simultaneously kills the man, while the man's katana pierces through his shoulder.

After Ma escapes, he is arrested by the police. Before he lets himself be handcuffed, his fiancée tells him that he is the only family she has left and will wait until the end of time for him to come back to her.

Cast
Philip Ng as Ma Yongzhen
Andy On as Long Qi
Sammo Hung as Master Tie
Michelle Hu as Tie Ju
Chen Kuan-tai as Baldy Bai
Mao Junjie as Sheng Xiangjun
Jiang Luxia as Tie Mei
Yuen Cheung-yan as Laughing Buddha
Fung Hak-on as Scruffy Chou

See also
Sammo Hung filmography
Wong Jing filmography

References

External links
 

2014 films
Hong Kong action films
Hong Kong martial arts films
2014 action films
Kung fu films
Triad films
2010s Cantonese-language films
Films directed by Wong Ching-po
Films set in Shanghai
Hong Kong films about revenge
Remakes of Hong Kong films
2014 martial arts films
2010s Hong Kong films